Cosmopterix ingeniosa is a moth of the family Cosmopterigidae. It is known from India.

References

ingeniosa